Genitoplasty is plastic surgery to the genitals. Genitoplasties may be reconstructive to repair injuries, and damage arising from cancer treatment, or congenital disorders, endocrine conditions, or they may be cosmetic.


Medical uses
Genitoplasty surgery includes the following:

 Vaginoplasty
 Correction of congenital conditions
 congenital adrenal hyperplasia
 microphallus repair
 hypospadias repair
 pseudovaginal perineoscrotal hypospadias repair
 androgen insensitivity syndrome repair
 repair of a urethra that is short
 labiaplasty
 vaginal construction
 vaginal reconstruction
 repair of vaginal vault prolapse
 vaginal suspension and fixation
 operations on cul-de-sac
 repair of cystocele
 repair of rectocele
 genital prolapse
 retropubic paravaginal repair
 hymenorrhaphy

The grafts used in genitalplasty can be an allogenic, an autograft, a xenograft, or an autologous material.

Genital reconstruction surgery can correct prolapse of the urinary bladder into the vagina and protrusion of the rectum into the vagina. Female infants born with a 46,XX genotype but have genitalia affected by congenital adrenal hyperplasia may undergo the surgical creation of a vagina. Vaginoplasty is commonly used to treat women with the congenital absence of the vagina. Other reasons for the surgery are to treat adrenal hyperplasia, microphallus, Mayer-Rokitansky-Kustner disorder and for women who have had a vaginectomy after malignancy or trauma. Reconstructive and corrective vaginal surgery restores or creates the vagina.

Surgeries to modify the cosmetic appearance of infants' and children's genitals are controversial due to their human rights implications. There is no clinical consensus about necessity, timing, indications or evaluation.

See also
 Intersex medical interventions

References

Gynecological surgery
Surgical oncology
Surgical removal procedures
Gynaecology
Reproductive system
Female genital modification
Plastic surgery
Vagina
Surgical procedures and techniques
Congenital disorders